Tsang Chiu Tat (born 13 February 1989) is a Hong Kong professional football coach and a former professional football player. He is currently the interim head coach of Hong Kong Premier League club Lee Man.

Club career
After 8 years of professional football career, Tsang retired after the end of the 2015–16 season, last played for Yuen Long.

Managerial career

Yuen Long
In July 2016, Tsang was appointed as the head coach of Yuen Long at the age of only 27. In January 2018, he led the club to win the first-ever Senior Shield title in 50 years.

Lee Man
In July 2018, Tsang was appointed as the assistant coach of Lee Man, partnering with Chan Hiu Ming. 

On 5 February 2023, Tsang was appointed as the interim head coach of the club after the sacking of Chan.

References

1989 births
Living people
Hong Kong people
Hong Kong footballers
Association football defenders
Hong Kong football managers
Hong Kong First Division League players
Hong Kong Premier League players
Eastern Sports Club footballers
Citizen AA players
Southern District FC players
Yuen Long FC players
Alumni of the City University of Hong Kong